Fighting Death is a lost 1914 silent film adventure drama directed by Herbert Blaché and starring early stunt performer Rodman Law and Claire Whitney. It was produced by the historic Solax Film Company.

Some filming involving stuntman Law took place at the Williamsburg Bridge.

Cast
Claire Whitney - Clara
Rodman Law - Jim Mason
Constance Bennett - Stunt Double for Clara (*note not Constance Bennett)

References

External links
Fighting Death @ IMDb.com
lobby poster

1914 films
American silent feature films
Films directed by Herbert Blaché
Lost American films
American black-and-white films
American adventure drama films
1910s adventure drama films
1914 lost films
1914 drama films
Lost drama films
1910s American films
Silent American drama films
Silent adventure drama films